The Stammerer is an epithet applied to:

Bohemond III of Antioch (1144–1201), Prince of Antioch
Louis the Stammerer (846-879), King of Aquitaine and later King of West Francia
Michael II (770-829), Emperor of the Byzantine Empire
Notker the Stammerer (c. 840-912), musician, author, poet and Benedictine monk in what is now Switzerland

See also
Lambert le Bègue (English: "the Stammerer" or "the Stutterer"), 12th century priest and reformer in Liege
List of stutterers

Lists of people by epithet